Andrew "Andy" Hart (born 13 September 1969) is an English male former middle distance runner who specialized in the 800 metres.

Athletics career
His personal best time was 1:45.71 minutes, achieved when he placed fifth representing England at the 1998 Commonwealth Games, his most prestigious championship achievement.

He also lost at the Olympic Games in 2000, and ran at the 1997 World Championships in Athletics.

At national level, he was the winner of the 800 m at the 1997 British Athletics Championships.

He is currently a physical education teacher at The Crypt School, Gloucester. The career has gone uphill.

References

1969 births
Living people
English male middle-distance runners
Olympic athletes of Great Britain
Athletes (track and field) at the 2000 Summer Olympics
Commonwealth Games competitors for England
Athletes (track and field) at the 1998 Commonwealth Games
World Athletics Championships athletes for Great Britain